These are the Canadian number-one albums of 2011. The chart is compiled by Nielsen Soundscan and published by Jam! Canoe, issued every Sunday. The chart also appears in Billboard magazine as Top Canadian Albums.

See also
List of Canadian Hot 100 number-one singles of 2011
List of number-one digital songs of 2011 (Canada)

References
Billboard Top Canadian Albums

External links
Top 100 albums in Canada on Jam
Billboard Top Canadian Albums

2011
Canada
2011 in Canadian music